Arias & Symphonies is the second studio album by Canadian new wave band Spoons, released in October 1982 by Ready Records. It contains the highly successful singles "Nova Heart" and "Arias & Symphonies". It was first released on CD in 2000. In 2012, a 30th Anniversary Edition of the album was released on CD with bonus tracks, which are mostly live recordings from Barrymore's, Ottawa, October 26, 1982, originally recorded and broadcast by CHEZ-FM. The iTunes download version includes an extra "live CD" of their performance at the El Mocambo in Toronto, June 26, 1982, which was originally broadcast by CHUM-FM.

The photograph on the album cover is from the Spanish Riding School in Vienna, Austria.

Background
After the release of the band's debut studio album, Stick Figure Neighbourhood (1981), Gordon Deppe stated "the album, it wasn't a good representation of what we were capable of...we've got the same kind of attitude towards life but...the songs are taking us around the world. We're getting out of the neighbourhood."

Deppe continued by noting that the songs for Arias & Symphonies would be more dance oriented, as their European influences, such as Orchestral Manoeuvres in the Dark (OMD) and Peter Hammill, have done.

Arias & Symphonies was named one of the 20 Most Influential Albums of the 1980s by The Chart Magazine, and the song "Nova Heart" garnered a spot in Bob Mercereau's book "The Top 100 Canadian Singles".

Track listing

Personnel
Credits are adapted from the Arias & Symphonies liner notes.

Spoons
 Gordon Deppe — vocals; guitar
 Sandy Horne — bass guitar; vocals
 Rob Preuss — Jupiter IV; SH-2000
 Derrick Ross — drums; percussion

Production
 John Punter — producer; mixer
 Mike Jones — engineer
 Robert DiGioia — assistant engineer
 Carey Gurden — assistant engineer

References

External links
 

1982 albums
A&M Records albums
Albums produced by John Punter
Spoons (band) albums